Muaythai competition at the 2014 Asian Beach Games was held in Phuket, Thailand from 18 to 22 November 2014 at Patong Beach, Phuket. There were six women's events in original program but light welterweight event was cancelled due to lack of entries.

Medalists

Men

Women

Medal table

Results

Men

48 kg

51 kg

54 kg

57 kg

60 kg

63.5 kg

67 kg

71 kg

75 kg

81 kg

Women

48 kg

51 kg

54 kg

57 kg

60 kg

References 

Medal table

External links 
 

2014 Asian Beach Games events
2014